Tengaponiya is one of the four main clans, into which the Deori tribe of India is divided. The other three major clans are Dibongia, Bo-geenya and Pator-goya.

In ancient time, the Tengaponiya clan lived on the bank of  river Tengapani, hence their name.

Ethnic groups in India